Chattonellales is an order of algae belonging to the class Raphidophyceae.

Families:
 Chattonellaceae J.Throndsen
 Fibrocapsaceae Cavalier-Smith  
 Haramonadaceae Cavalier-Smith  
 Stroemiaceae
 Vacuolariaceae A.Luther, Luther

References

Ochrophyta
Heterokont orders